Joan Walsh Anglund (January 3, 1926 – March 9, 2021) was an American poet and children's book author and illustrator. A Friend Is Someone Who Likes You, her first children's books, was one of the New York Times Best Illustrated Children’s Books. She published more than 120 books, and as of 2014, she had sold over 45 million books worldwide.

In 2015 a United States Postal Service stamp was issued commemorating the American author and poet Maya Angelou with the Joan Walsh Anglund quote "A bird doesn’t sing because it has an answer, it sings because it has a song" though the stamp apparently attributes the quote to Angelou. The quote is from Anglund's book of poems A Cup of Sun (1967). President Obama also wrongly attributed the sentence to Angelou during the presentation of the 2013 National Medal of Arts and National Humanities Medal.

Life 
Anglund was born on January 3 in 1926 in Hinsdale, Illinois. Her parents were Thomas and Mildred Walsh. She studied at the Art Institute of Chicago and at the American Academy of Art in the mid-1940s. She met her future husband, the actor and playwright Bob Anglund, in 1946. They married in 1947 before moving to Pasadena in California.

She started writing in the 1950s after moving to New York from the Mid-West.

Anglund had two children, Joy Anglund Harvey and Todd.

Anglund died March 9, 2021, at age 95, of heart failure.

Works

Poetry for children 

 The Golden Treasury of Poetry, 1959
 The Golden Book of Poems for the Very Young, 1971

Poetry for adults 

 A Cup of Sun, 1967
 A Slice of Snow, 1970
 Goodbye, Yesterday, 1974

Children's books 
A Friend Is Someone Who Likes You, Harcourt, 1958
The Brave Cowboy, Harcourt, 1959
 Look out the Window, 1959
Love Is a Special Way of Feeling, 1960
In a Pumpkin Shell, Harcourt, 1960
Cowboy and His Friend
Christmas Is a Time of Giving, 1961
Nibble Nibble Mousekin
Spring Is a New Beginning, 1963
 Childhood is a time of innocence, 1964
 Cowboy's Secret Life
 A Pocketful of Proverbs, Collins, 1965
 The Joan Walsh Anglund Sampler
 Un Ami, C'Est Quelqu'un Qui T'aime
 A Book of Good Tidings
 What Color is Love?
 A Year is Round
Babies Are a Bit of Heaven, 2002
Love Is the Best Teacher, 2004
 Faith Is a Flower, 2006

Critical reception 
The New York Times regularly reviewed Anglund's children's books, describing the narrative universe created by Anglund as reassuring and comfortable.

References

External links

Author's website
NYT obituary

1926 births
2021 deaths
American women poets
American children's writers
American women illustrators